Thomas Moore Manby (1 January 1769 – 13 June 1834) was a British naval officer who fought in the French Revolutionary Wars and Napoleonic Wars and later rose to the rank of rear admiral. He sailed with George Vancouver on his voyages of exploration, captained Bordelais, Africaine and Thalia, and was the chief suspect in the "delicate investigation" into the morals of Caroline, Princess of Wales.

Childhood and early naval career

Manby was born in the village of Hilgay on the edge of the Norfolk Fens. His father, Matthew Pepper Manby, was lord of the manor of Wood Hall in Hilgay and a former soldier and aide-de-camp to Lord Townshend. Manby's eldest sister Mary Jane (1763-1773), John (1773-1783) and two other siblings died as children. His eldest brother was George William Manby, the inventor of life-saving devices including the Manby mortar.
Lord Townshend arranged a position for the young Manby in the stationers of the ordnance department, but Manby dreamt of a life at sea and at the age of 14 resigned his post and embarked as a midshipman on board the 24-gun .

Voyage with Vancouver

In 1790, when he was 21, Manby was appointed as master's mate on George Vancouver's ship . The Admiralty had ordered Vancouver to complete a survey of the north-west coast of America and take possession of disputed land at Nootka Sound on the island that is now Vancouver Island. Discovery was fitted out for exploration, complete with a plant frame on the quarterdeck to bring back specimens. Together with the brig , the Discovery left Plymouth 1 April 1791. The two ships called at New Zealand, Tahiti and Hawaii before reaching the starting point for the American survey, the Strait of Juan de Fuca, almost exactly a year after setting out. Manby recorded first impressions of the coast:
"It had more the aspect of enchantment than reality, with silent admiration each discerned the beauties of Nature, and nought was heard on board but expressions of delight murmured from every tongue. Imperceptibly our Bark skimmed over the glassy surface of the deep, about three Miles an hour, a gentle breeze swelled the lofty Canvass whilst all was calm below".
The Discovery and Chatham spent the next three summers surveying the north-west coast of America, passing the winters in Hawaii. They arrived at Nootka Sound in the autumn of 1792 and, when disputes arose with the Spanish, several officers were sent back to England to request instructions from the Admiralty. Manby was promoted to fill vacant places: firstly as master of Chatham and then as lieutenant on Discovery. The relationship between Manby and Vancouver was not however a harmonious one. Manby wrote that Vancouver: "is grown Haughty Proud Mean and Insolent, which has kept himself and his Officers in a continual state of wrangling..."

French Revolutionary Wars

The expedition returned in 1795, by which time England was at war with France. Manby spent the next year as a lieutenant in the 84-gun Juste and then in early 1797 was appointed as commander of the 44-gun HMS Charon, guarding trade in Irish Sea and the Channel. During the two years he commanded Charon, Manby provided protection to 4753 vessels, not one of which was lost, and he also captured a French privateer, the Alexandrine.

Manby was promoted to post-captain rank 22 January 1799, three weeks after his thirtieth birthday. Later that year he was appointed commander of the 24-gun Bordelais, a former French privateer which was nicknamed the Coffin on account of her dangerous build. Manby had rescued his brother George Manby from debtors' prison, and he now took him on board his ship as a lay chaplain. On a trip to Ireland the Bordelais foundered on a sandbank; Manby managed to refloat her by throwing everything possible overboard and they limped back to Plymouth. The incident brought home to George Manby the dangers of a lee shore in a storm and led to his invention of Manby's mortar, a life-line for sailors wrecked close to shore. Back in Plymouth, George Manby underwent an operation to remove slugs and rotting hat from his skull (he had been shot by his wife's lover some years previously). Afterwards he appeared to be dying and decided that he "preferred to die at sea among sailors (a consoling and compassionate class of man) rather than be left in the care of a mistress of lodgings, to be hurried to my grave unnoticed and unknown". So Manby took him back on board before setting off for duty around the Azores. During the trip Bordelais captured a valuable coffee-laden French prize, and George Manby recovered his health.

After a short period spent blockading the port of Flushing, the Bordelais (1798 ship) was sent to the Caribbean, where she sank the French warship Curieuse.
A notice dated August 14, 1802 in The London Gazette stated that Head money would be paid to the Bourdelois(sic) crew for La Courier (sic) French Corvette, destroyed in the West Indies 29 January 1801.

Napoleonic Wars

Manby was not out of commission for long. In October 1802 the Earl of St Vincent, first Lord of the Admiralty, sent for him and said 'I don't like to see an active officer idle on shore; I therefore give you the Africaine, one of the finest frigates in the British navy'. On leaving the Juno, Manby had visited his friend and patron, Lord Townshend, at Raynham Hall in Norfolk, and Lady Townshend had introduced him to Caroline, princess of Wales. While HMS Africaine was fitting out at Deptford Dockyard, Manby was a frequent visitor to Montagu House in Blackheath where the princess, who was estranged from her husband the prince of Wales, lived. Manby soon replaced Sir Sidney Smith in the princess's affections. She bought the soft furnishings for his cabin and asked the Admiralty to send the Africaine to attend her in the Downs when she rented a house at Ramsgate in the summer. War with France had resumed and the Africaine was called away from her royal duties to blockade the port of Hellevoetsluis, although Manby was able to visit the princess again the following summer when she took a house in Southend and the Africaine anchored off the Nore for a few weeks.

After two years blockading Hellevoetsluis, the Africaine joined Admiral Russell's squadron off the Texel and was badly damaged in a storm. Having refitted at Sheerness, Manby was ordered to escort a fleet of merchant ships to the Caribbean. On the return journey there was an outbreak of yellow fever on board. Three days out from Carlisle Bay the ship's surgeon and assistant were dead, and Manby had to take care of the sick. Acting on the instructions of a doctor who came alongside in a small boat from Saint Kitts, he treated them with calomel. By the time the Africaine reached England she had lost nearly one-third of her crew and officers, and had to spend forty days in quarantine off the Isles of Scilly. Manby had survived an attack of the fever and large doses of calomel, but his health never recovered. He had also received several serious wounds in action, and had suffered from rheumatic pains since his voyages with Vancouver.

The Africaine was decommissioned and Manby was appointed to the frigate Thalia. He spent a year in command of a squadron off the Channel Islands and captured a French privateer, before being sent in 1808 to search for two French frigates off Greenland. The French frigates were not found, but Manby surveyed and named Port Manvers on the coast of Labrador before returning to England. It was to be his last voyage. He accepted medical advice to give up his ship and bought an estate in Northwold in Norfolk.

In 1806 the king, at the request of his son the prince of Wales, ordered an inquiry into rumours that the princess of Wales had given birth to a child. A number of men were suspected of having had a relationship with the princess (which was grounds for a charge of high treason), but it was Manby against whom the evidence was "particularly strong". Manby was called before the commissioners of the inquiry and swore on oath that he never did "at Montagu House, Southend, Ramsgate, East Cliff, or anywhere else, ever sleep in any house occupied by, or belonging to, HRH the Princess of Wales". The commissioners concluded that the main accusation against the princess was unfounded, but nevertheless they criticised her behaviour. The princess was defended by former attorney-general and future prime-minister Spencer Perceval, who dismissed the evidence of the princess's servants as 'hearsay representations'. The gifts and letters from the princess to Manby were evidence only of her gratitude for Manby having taken two of her charity boys on board the Africaine, and his frequent visits were to keep the princess informed of their progress. If jugs of water and towels were left in the passage when Manby visited it was proof, Perceval argued, of the servants' slovenliness and not of high treason. Perceval was ready to publish his defence in the form of a book when there was a sudden change of government, the princess was accepted at court, and the book was suppressed. After Perceval's assassination in 1812 the book was published and extracts, including Manby's testimony, were published in the Times.

Retirement

Having given up his naval career on medical advice, Manby settled on an estate in Norfolk and in 1810 married twenty-year-old Judith Hammond. The marriage produced two daughters: Mary Harcourt Manby (1810-1850) and Georgina Manvers Manby (1815-1900). A natural daughter, Elizabeth Annabella Montgomery Manby, had been born in 1807. Sons-in-law included James Dawes, Baron de Flassans (nephew of Sophie Dawes, Baronne de Feuchères, and first husband of Mary Harcourt), Sir Cavendish Stuart Rumbold, 4th Baronet (second husband of Mary Harcourt), and the French diplomat and politician, Théodore Adolphe Barrot (husband of Georgina Manvers). Manby later moved to London and also had a country house in Christchurch, Dorset. He worked on a chart of the South Pacific which he hoped would prove that the peoples of the region had a common origin, and helped solve the mystery of the disappearance of La Pérouse's ships when he identified medals found by an English whaler in the South Pacific as having belonged to the explorer. He was promoted, by seniority, to rear admiral in 1825.

An inquest at the George Hotel, Southampton on June 14 was held by G. B. Corfe, Esq.
The jury were told it appeared that the  deceased had  been a long time in a dejected way, and that he had purchased a large quantity of opium, and from the quantity left it is supposed the unfortunate gentleman must have taken 134 grains. The jury deliberated some time and returned a verdict of "Died of taking incautiously an over-dose of opium." The body was taken from the George Hotel, and was interred in South Stoneham.

References

External links
A short biography of Thomas Manby including copies of his lieutenant's certificate and his will
An extract of Thomas Manby's 1793 Hawaiian journal (first part)
An extract of Thomas Manby's 1793 Hawaiian journal (second part)

Royal Navy personnel of the French Revolutionary Wars
British naval commanders of the Napoleonic Wars
People from Northwold
1769 births
1834 deaths
Royal Navy admirals
Drug-related deaths in England
People from King's Lynn and West Norfolk (district)
Military personnel from Norfolk
Burials in Hampshire